Setario is a surname. Notable people with the surname include:

Gabriele Setario, Italian Roman Catholic bishop, 1491–1510
Giovanni Francesco Setario (died 1516), Italian Roman Catholic bishop

 Surnames of Italian origin